Moylagh is a townland near Gortaclare in County Tyrone, Northern Ireland. In the 2001 Census it had a population of 66 people (along with Gortaclare). It lies within the Omagh District Council area.

References 

NI Neighbourhood Information System

Townlands of County Tyrone